Kathryn Fry Hester (born December 31, 1974) is a Democratic member of the Maryland Senate from the 9th District, based in Carroll County and Howard County.

Early life and career
Hester was born on December 31, 1974. She attended Cornell University in 1997, earning a Bachelor of Science degree in agricultural and biological engineering. After graduating, she worked as a senior analyst at Arthur D. Little from 1998 to 2001 and as the manager of research and advocacy at SustainAbility from 2001 to 2009. She also is a Maryland first responder and volunteers for WISP Ski Patrol.

Hester got involved in politics following the 2016 presidential election out of concern that political divisiveness in Washington was spilling over into her community. Hester joined liberal groups like Indivisible and Do the Most Good and created a small group called Building Bridges with the aim of bringing civility back to her community. She attended the 2017 Women's March on Washington with her two daughters, Sierra and Alexa.

In July 2017, Hester filed to run for Maryland Senate, challenging Republican incumbent Gail H. Bates. She was uncontested in the Democratic primary, and state Senate Democrats viewed the District 9 Senate election as a potential pickup opportunity given the national environment. Maryland Matters ranked her election among the eight most competitive elections in the Maryland General Assembly that year. She defeated Bates in the general election by 531 votes, and was the only Democrat to oust a Republican senator in Maryland in the 2018 Maryland Senate election.

In the legislature
Hester was sworn into the Maryland Senate on January 9, 2019. She is the first Democrat to represent District 9 in the Maryland Senate since Senator Charles Smelser in 1994.

She has filed to run for re-election in the 2022 Maryland Senate elections.

Committee assignments
 Education, Health and Environmental Affairs Committee, 2020–present (alcohol subcommittee, 2020–present; health subcommittee, 2020–present)
 Joint Committee on Cybersecurity, Information Technology and Biotechnology, 2019–present
 Joint Audit and Evaluation Committee, 2019–present
 Protocol Committee, 2020–present
 Judicial Proceedings Committee, 2019
 Joint Audit Committee, 2019
 Work Group to Study Shelter and Supportive Services for Unaccompanied Homeless Minors, 2019–2020

Other memberships
 Women Legislators of Maryland, 2019–present

Political positions
Hester is a self-described moderate Democrat, seeking to find common ground with Republicans.

Environment
In March 2019, Hester worried that a bill banning the use of plastic foam food containers in Maryland would hurt farmers, including those in her district. After the bill passed the legislature passed the Maryland Senate, she proposed passing legislation to help egg farmers transition to different kinds of materials, appealing to a compromise offered by Republican senator Jack Bailey.

In 2020, Hester worked alongside state delegate Courtney Watson to secure $8.25 million dollars in funding from the state to support Howard County executive Calvin Ball's Safe & Sound Plan, a multi-phase proposal to advance flood mitigation projects and support local business and property owners in Ellicott City, Maryland.

In 2021, the Maryland League of Conservation Voters gave Hester a perfect score in their annual environmental scorecard.

Minimum wage
In March 2019, when the Maryland General Assembly was deciding whether to override Governor Larry Hogan's veto of a $15 minimum wage bill, Hester was tempted to vote against the minimum wage veto override, joining Republican senators who said a $15 wage would lead to job losses and hurt places in her district. She ultimately decided to vote to override the governor's veto on the bill, viewing it as a step toward economic equity, but she also supported GOP proposals to vary the minimum wage in different parts of the state and offered an amendment to give certain small businesses more time to pay the higher wage, both of which were rejected by Senate Democrats.

In April 2019, Hester convened a bipartisan workgroup consisting of Democratic senators Guy Guzzone and Brian Feldman and Republican senators Andrew Serafini, Christopher R. West, and Mary Beth Carozza to look at possible aid for small business owners in light of the $15 minimum wage veto override.

An 2021 analysis by the Maryland Free Enterprise Foundation, a business advocacy group, gave Hester a score of 33 percent, making her the second most business-friendly Democrat in the Maryland General Assembly.

Electoral history

References

Cornell University alumni
Living people
Democratic Party Maryland state senators
21st-century American politicians
21st-century American women politicians
Women state legislators in Maryland
1974 births